Assembly of First Nations (National Indian Brotherhood before 1982) leadership elections are held every three years to elect the national chief of the Assembly of First Nations.  Each chief of a First Nation in Canada is eligible to cast a vote.  Currently there are 634 eligible voters.

AFN rules state that a candidate needs 60% of the votes to win the election. If multiple candidates are on the ballot, the candidate with the fewest votes on each ballot is dropped until one candidate has reached the required percentage of votes. Additionally, any candidate who receives less than 15 per cent of the vote on a ballot is automatically dropped.

If only two candidates remain, however, the candidate with fewer votes is not dropped from the ballot automatically, but rather the race continues to another ballot until the leading candidate reaches 60 per cent or the trailing candidate voluntarily concedes.

1968
Winner: Walter Dieter

1970

Winner: George Manuel

1972

Winner: George Manuel

1974

Winner: George Manuel

1976
Held in Whitehorse, Yukon on September 16, 1976.

Winner: Noel Starblanket (acclaimed)

1978

Winner: Noel Starblanket

1980

Winner: Delbert Riley

1982
Held in Penticton, British Columbia on April 21, 1982.

First ballot

For this election the two candidates with the fewest votes on the first ballot were dropped. This applied to Linklater and Powderface. Riley then announced he would withdraw.

Second ballot

1985
Held in Vancouver, British Columbia on July 30, 1985.

First ballot

Second ballot

1988
Held in Edmonton, Alberta.

Winner: Georges Erasmus

1991
Held in Winnipeg, Manitoba on June 11, 1991.

First ballot

1994
Held in Saskatoon, Saskatchewan on July 6, 1994.

First ballot

Second ballot

Third ballot

1997
Held in Vancouver, British Columbia on July 30, 1997.

First ballot

Second ballot

Third ballot

Fourth ballot

2000
Held in Ottawa, Ontario on July 12, 2000.

First ballot

Second ballot

2003
Held in Edmonton, Alberta on July 16, 2003.

First ballot

Second ballot

2006
Held in Vancouver, British Columbia on July 12, 2006.

2009
The 2009 convention was held in Calgary, Alberta on July 22.

At the close of nominations on June 16, the declared candidates were AFN's British Columbia regional chief Shawn Atleo, Roseau River First Nation chief Terry Nelson, Federation of Saskatchewan Indian Nations chief Perry Bellegarde, British Columbia land claims negotiator Bill Wilson and former Union of Ontario Indians chief John Beaucage.

Beginning with the second ballot, the convention went into an unprecedented deadlock, with six successive ballots in which the final two candidates effectively tied at roughly 50 per cent of the vote. Under AFN rules, a candidate requires 60 per cent of the vote to win unless their opponent voluntarily concedes the race. Bellegarde conceded after the eighth ballot, on which Atleo had surged ahead to a 58 per cent finish.

First ballot

Nelson and Wilson were automatically dropped after the first ballot, as both failed to garner 15 per cent of the vote. Both candidates endorsed Bellegarde on the second ballot. Beaucage, as the last-place finisher among the three remaining candidates, voluntarily dropped out shortly after the ballot results were announced, also endorsing Bellegarde.

Second ballot

Third ballot

Fourth ballot

Fifth ballot

Sixth ballot

Seventh ballot

Eighth ballot

2012
The 2012 convention was held in Toronto, Ontario on July 18, 2012

At the close of nominations on June 12, the declared candidates were Shawn Atleo, Diane Kelly, Bill Erasmus, Terrance Nelson, Pamela Palmater, Ellen Gabriel, Joan Jack and George Stanley.

First ballot

Second ballot

Third ballot

2014
The 2014 leadership election took place on December 10. The candidates were Perry Bellegarde, the chief of the Federation of Saskatchewan Indian Nations and the runner-up to Atleo in 2009; Ghislain Picard, the AFN's regional chief for Quebec and Labrador and the organization's interim chief since Atleo's resignation; and Leon Jourdain, the former grand chief of the Treaty 3 area in Manitoba and Northwestern Ontario.

2018 
The 2018 leadership election took place on July 25, 2018, at the Annual General Assembly in Vancouver, British Columbia. Loretta Pete Lambert, of the Little Pine Cree Nation in Saskatchewan, was the chief electoral officer. The candidates were the incumbent, Perry Bellegarde, from the Little Black Bear First Nation; policy analyst Russell Diabo, a member of the Mohawk Nation at Kahnawake; Grand Chief of Manitoba Keewatinowi Okimakanak Sheila North, a member of the Bunibonibee Cree Nation; economist and former President of the Council of the Haida Nation Miles Richardson; and Katherine Whitecloud, former Manitoba regional chief for the AFN, and member of Wipazoka Wakpa Dakota Nation.

First ballot

Second ballot

2021 
RoseAnne Archibald secured victory on July 8, 2021, after her rival, Reginald Bellerose, conceded. The election had stretched to a second day and went to a fifth round of voting after neither Archibald nor Bellerose received the necessary 60% of votes to win. That remained the case when the Assembly of First Nations announced the fifth-ballot results, but Bellerose announced he was withdrawing from the race before a sixth round of voting could begin.

See also 
 Presidents of Inuit Tapiriit Kanatami
 Metis National Council

References

First Nations history

Political party leadership elections in Canada
Ethnic bodies and representatives elections